Gladys Jerotich Kipkemoi (born 15 October 1986) is a Kenyan long-distance runner who specializes in the 3000 metres steeplechase.

She won the 2004 World Junior Championships and finished fourth at the 2006 World Athletics Final.

International competitions

Personal bests
3000 metres - 9:08.22 min (2006)
3000 metres steeplechase - 9:13.22 min (2010)

References

External links

1986 births
Living people
Kenyan female long-distance runners
World Athletics Championships athletes for Kenya
Kenyan female steeplechase runners
Commonwealth Games medallists in athletics
Commonwealth Games bronze medallists for Kenya
Athletes (track and field) at the 2010 Commonwealth Games
21st-century Kenyan women
Medallists at the 2010 Commonwealth Games